Norscopolamine is a tropane alkaloid isolated from Atropanthe sinensis.

See also
 Aposcopolamine
 Littorine
 Meteloidine
 Scopolamine

References

Tropane alkaloids
Epoxides